Sergio Maximiliano Ojeda (born 4 January 1992) is an Argentine professional footballer who plays as a centre-back for Patronato.

Career
Ojeda started his career with Independiente, receiving his professional debut on 24 February 2013 in an Argentine Primera División win over Racing Club. In his ninth league appearance for Independiente, Ojeda scored his first senior goal in a 2–0 victory against San Martín on 9 May 2014. On 18 January 2015, Ojeda was signed on loan by Gimnasia y Esgrima of Primera B Nacional. Three goals in thirty matches followed during 2015. He returned to Independiente at the end of 2015, but was soon resigned on loan by Gimnasia y Esgrima in 2016. He remained for two seasons and made forty-nine appearances.

In July 2017, Ojeda joined fellow Primera División side Olimpo on loan. His first appearance for Olimpo arrived on 2 December versus Chacarita Juniors. A move to Deportes La Serena of Chile's Primera B was completed in July 2018. In January 2019, after featuring fourteen times and scoring twice, Ojeda moved to Ecuador to join Deportivo Cuenca.

On 17 February 2021, Ojeda joined Patronato on a deal until the end of 2022.

Career statistics
.

References

External links

1992 births
Living people
Argentine footballers
Argentine expatriate footballers
People from Río Cuarto, Córdoba
Association football defenders
Argentine Primera División players
Primera Nacional players
Primera B de Chile players
Club Atlético Independiente footballers
Gimnasia y Esgrima de Jujuy footballers
Olimpo footballers
Deportes La Serena footballers
C.D. Cuenca footballers
Club Atlético Patronato footballers
Argentine expatriate sportspeople in Chile
Argentine expatriate sportspeople in Ecuador
Expatriate footballers in Chile
Expatriate footballers in Ecuador
Sportspeople from Córdoba Province, Argentina